Nikolai Nikolayevich Kotovets (born 25 June 1970) is a Russian professional football manager and a former player. He is an assistant coach with FC Akron Tolyatti.

External links
 

1970 births
Living people
Soviet footballers
Russian footballers
Association football defenders
FC Volgar Astrakhan players
FC Energiya Volzhsky players
FC Rotor Volgograd players
FC Yenisey Krasnoyarsk players
Russian football managers
FC Chita players
FC Volga Ulyanovsk players
FC Mashuk-KMV Pyatigorsk players
FC Amur Blagoveshchensk players
FC Dynamo Kirov players